Love Business is a 1931 Our Gang short comedy film directed by Robert F. McGowan. It was the 104th (16th talking episode) Our Gang short that was released.

Plot
Jackie is hopelessly in love with Miss Crabtree. At the same time, his sister Mary Ann tells their mother that Jackie is in love with Miss Crabtree. Jackie runs off to school without eating breakfast. Meanwhile, Miss Crabtree becomes a boarder in Jackie's home and moves in later that day. Chubby also is in love with Miss Crabtree and practices kissing her on an oversized cardboard statue of Greta Garbo. Then at school, Wheezer tells Jackie, Mary Ann, Chubby, Farina, Donald, and Bonedust that Miss Crabtree was moving into their house. Jackie has mixed emotions about this.

That evening, Miss Crabtree has dinner with Jackie, Mary Ann, Wheezer, and their mother. Mothballs fell into the soup a bit earlier giving the soup a very bitter taste. Later, Chubby stops in to see Miss Crabtree and recites some very romantic poetry. Miss Crabtree asks Chubby where he got all this stuff. He says from Wheezer (who got them from his mother's old love letters). Mother hears this and is about to give Wheezer a spanking but decides not to in the end.

Note
Most of the schoolyard scenes were edited out of the Little Rascals television print in 1971 due to stereotyping of African-Americans but reinstated in 1990s home video and in 2001 AMC showings.

Cast

The Gang
 Jackie Cooper as Jackie Cooper
 Norman Chaney as  Norman 'Chubby'
 Matthew Beard as Stymie
 Dorothy DeBorba as Dorothy 'Echo'
 Allen Hoskins as Farina
 Bobby Hutchins as Wheezer Cooper
 Mary Ann Jackson as Mary Ann Cooper
 Shirley Jean Rickert as Shirley
 Donald Haines as Donald
 Bobby Young as Bonedust
 Pete the Pup as himself

Additional cast
 June Marlowe as Miss June Crabtree
 May Wallace as May Wallace Cooper, Jackie's mother
 Baldwin Cooke as Undetermined role

See also
 Our Gang filmography

References

External links

1931 films
Films directed by Robert F. McGowan
Hal Roach Studios short films
American black-and-white films
Our Gang films
1931 comedy films
Films with screenplays by H. M. Walker
1931 short films
1930s American films